Sterling Walter Hayden (born Sterling Relyea Walter; March 26, 1916 – May 23, 1986) was an American actor, author, sailor and decorated Marine Corps officer and an Office of Strategic Services' agent during World War II. A leading man for most of his career, he specialized in westerns and film noir throughout the 1950s, in films such as John Huston's The Asphalt Jungle (1950), Nicholas Ray's Johnny Guitar (1954), and Stanley Kubrick's The Killing (1956). He became noted for supporting roles in the 1960s, perhaps most memorably as General Jack D. Ripper in Kubrick's Dr. Strangelove or: How I Learned to Stop Worrying and Love the Bomb (1964).

Hayden's success continued into the New Hollywood era, with roles such as Irish-American policeman Captain McCluskey in Francis Ford Coppola's The Godfather (1972), alcoholic novelist Roger Wade in Robert Altman's The Long Goodbye (1973), and elderly peasant Leo Dalcò in Bernardo Bertolucci's 1900 (1976).

Biography

Youth and education
Hayden was born March 26, 1916, in Upper Montclair, New Jersey, to George and Frances Walter, who named him Sterling Relyea Walter. After his father died, he was adopted at age 9 by James Hayden and renamed Sterling Walter Hayden. As a child he lived in coastal towns of New England, and in New Hampshire, Massachusetts, Pennsylvania, Washington, D.C., and Maine. He attended Wassookeag School in Dexter, Maine. 

Hayden dropped out of high school at the age of 16 and took a job as mate on a schooner. His first voyage was to Newport Beach, California, from New London, Connecticut. Later, he was a fisherman on the Grand Banks of Newfoundland, ran a charter yacht, and served as a fireman on 11 trips to Cuba aboard a steamer.

He skippered a trading schooner in the Caribbean after earning his master's license, and in 1937 he served as mate on a world cruise of the brigantine Yankee. After serving as sailor and fireman on larger vessels and sailing around the world several times, he was awarded his first command at age 22, skippering the square rigger Florence C. Robinson 7,700 miles from Gloucester, Massachusetts, to Tahiti in 1938. Hayden spoke of his nautical experiences before the monthly meeting of the Adventurers' Club of New York on March 21, 1940.

Early Hollywood years
In 1938, Hayden's photo was taken during the annual Gloucester, Massachusetts, Fishermen's Race. It went on the cover of a magazine prompting Paramount Pictures to call and offer a screen test. Hayden did a test in New York with Jeanne Cagney, James Cagney's sister. Hayden:
I was completely lost, ignorant, nervous. But the next thing I knew, Paramount made me a seven-year contract beginning at $250 a week, which was astronomical. I got my lovely old mother and bought a car, and we drove to California... I was so lost then I didn't think to analyze it. I said, 'This is nuts, but, damned, it's pleasant.' I had only one plan in mind: to get $5,000. I knew where there was a schooner, and then I'd haul ass.
Hayden went to Paramount in May 1940.

Paramount dubbed the  actor "The Most Beautiful Man in the Movies" and "The Beautiful Blond Viking God".

His first film, Virginia (1941), directed by Edward H. Griffith, starred Madeleine Carroll whom he married. He, Griffith and Carroll were reunited in Bahama Passage (1941).

In December 1941, it was reported that he had quit Hollywood saying "I'm no actor! I'm a sailor."

War service
After two film roles, he left Hollywood to fight in World War II. He enlisted in the Army and was sent to Scotland for training, but broke his ankle and was discharged.

He returned to the US and tried to buy a half-interest in a schooner but could not raise the money. He joined the United States Marine Corps as a private, under the name John Hamilton, an alias he never used otherwise. While at Parris Island, he was recommended for Officer Candidate School (OCS). 

After graduation from OCS, he was commissioned a second lieutenant and was transferred to service as an undercover agent with William J. "Wild Bill" Donovan's Office of the Coordinator of Information. He remained there after it became the Office of Strategic Services (OSS).

As OSS agent John Hamilton, his World War II service included motorboating with supplies from Italy to Yugoslav partisans and parachuting into fascist Croatia. Hayden, who also participated in the Naples–Foggia campaign and established air crew rescue teams in enemy-occupied territory, became a first lieutenant on September 13, 1944, and a captain on February 14, 1945. 

He received the Silver Star for gallantry in action in the Balkans and Mediterranean (according to his citation, "Lt. Hamilton displayed great courage in making hazardous sea voyages in enemy-infested waters and reconnaissance through enemy-held areas"), a Bronze Arrowhead device for parachuting behind enemy lines, and a commendation from Yugoslavia's Josip Broz Tito. He left active duty on December 24, 1945. Tito awarded him the Order of Merit.

Return to Hollywood
He returned to the US and told the press "I feel a real obligation to make this a better country – and I believe the movies are the place to do it."

Hayden returned to Paramount and was cast as one of several brothers in an aviation film, Blaze of Noon (1947). The studio suspended him when he turned down a role in The Sainted Sisters.

Hayden made two films for Pine Thomas Productions who distributed through Paramount: a western, El Paso (1949), supporting John Payne; and Manhandled (1949), a thriller with Dorothy Lamour.

The Red Scare

Hayden's admiration for the Communist partisans he had fought alongside during World War II led him into a brief membership in the Communist Party from 1946.

He was apparently active in supporting an effort by the Communist-controlled motion picture painters union to absorb other film industry unions. As the Red Scare deepened in the US, he testified before the House Committee on Un-American Activities about his brief Communist Party membership and "named names".

He later said "the FBI made it very clear to me that, if I became an 'unfriendly witness', I could damn well forget the custody of my children. I didn't want to go to jail, that was the other thing."

Hayden testified that joining the Party was "the stupidest and most ignorant thing I have ever done in my life". He added that he had quit the party but been persuaded to return by Karen Morley.

His wife at that time was Betty de Noon (m 1947). 

Hayden expressed remorse, however, over his testimony before, stating in his autobiography, "I don't think you have the foggiest notion of the contempt I have had for myself since the day I did that thing."

Film career
Hayden's career received a boost when cast by John Huston in the starring role in MGM's heist thriller, The Asphalt Jungle (1950). It was only a minor hit but was highly regarded critically and established Hayden as a leading man. 

He played a minister who doubts his faith in Journey into Light (1951), then supported Bette Davis in The Star (1952). It was not a large success but Flaming Feather (1952), a Western, did well. 

He followed it with a series of action films: Denver and Rio Grande (1952), a Western, for Paramount; Hellgate (1952), another Western; The Golden Hawk (1952), a pirate swashbuckler for producer Sam Katzman; Flat Top (1952), a Korean War drama; Fighter Attack (1953), a World War II film.

In 1952, while divorcing his second wife, the court heard Hayden made $100,000 the previous year.

Hayden then starred in So Big (1953), a melodrama from an Edna Ferber novel starring Jane Wyman, then it was back to medium budget action films: Take Me to Town (1953), a Western with Ann Sheridan; Kansas Pacific (1953), a Western for Walter Mirisch; Crime Wave (1954), a film noir.

He had a support role in a big studio picture, Prince Valiant (1954), playing Sir Gawain, then returned to more conventional material with Arrow in the Dust (1954). Johnny Guitar (1954) was another Western, but this one starred Joan Crawford and was directed by Nick Ray; it was a box office hit and became a cult favorite. It was financed by Republic Pictures, which used Hayden on several occasions.

There were some film noirs: Naked Alibi (1954) with Gloria Grahame and Suddenly (1954) with Frank Sinatra. Then it was action: Battle Taxi (1954), a Korean War movie; Timberjack (1955), a Western for Republic; Shotgun (1955), a Western with Yvonne de Carlo; The Eternal Sea (1955), a World War II naval story; Top Gun (1955), a Western for producer Edward Small.

The Last Command (1955) was the story of the Alamo for Republic, with Hayden as Jim Bowie. The Come On (1956) was a film noir with Anne Baxter. Hayden also began appearing on TV shows such as Celebrity Playhouse.

The Killing
Hayden was cast in a heist film which turned out to be a classic: The Killing (1956), an early work from director Stanley Kubrick.

He remained a "B picture" star though: Crime of Passion (1957), a noir; 5 Steps to Danger (1957), a mystery film; Valerie (1957), a Western "noir"; Zero Hour! (1957), a disaster film; Gun Battle at Monterey (1957), a Western; The Iron Sheriff (1957), a Western for Edward Small; Ten Days to Tulara (1958), an adventure film; Terror in a Texas Town (1958), a Western.

He also worked frequently on television, appearing on shows such as Dick Powell's Zane Grey Theatre, Wagon Train, General Electric Theater, Schlitz Playhouse, Playhouse 90, Goodyear Theatre, and The DuPont Show of the Month.

Travelling
Hayden often professed distaste for film acting, saying he did it mainly to pay for his ships and voyages. In 1958, after a bitter divorce from Betty Ann de Noon, Hayden was awarded custody of his children. He defied a court order and sailed to Tahiti with all four children, Christian, Dana, Gretchen and Matthew.

"I'd had it", he said. "One way or another, I felt that I had sold out – or failed – at almost everything in my whole life. It was either turn things around or hang myself."

The crew sailed from San Francisco Bay to Tahiti, where Hayden had planned to film a movie. Hayden also invited well-known photographer Dody Weston Thompson along to document the trip and to help shoot location choices. Her South Seas folio contains photographs of Hayden's schooner, The Wanderer; on-deck photos of life aboard the ship; colorful prints of his children, Tahitian women and children; and unique artifacts on shore. The film never materialized; however, according to Dody's notes, U.S. Camera and Travel printed her photographs of paradise in 1961. Marin County Superior Court Judge Harold Haley later ordered Hayden to repay Republic Pictures nearly $50,000 to recover the cost of financing the trip.

In 1960, he married Catherine Devine McConnell. They had two sons, Andrew and David, and were married until his death in 1986. McConnell also had a son (Scott McConnell) from her first marriage to Neil McConnell, an heir to Avon's founding family.

In November 1960 he said he was a "sailor or writer" rather than an actor.

In the early 1960s, Hayden rented one of the pilot houses of the retired ferryboat Berkeley, docked in Sausalito, California, where he lived while writing his autobiography Wanderer, which was first published in 1963.

Later career
In 1964, Hayden appeared in A Carol for Another Christmas on television. The same year he played one of his best-known characters, the deranged General Jack D. Ripper in the Kubrick-directed Dr. Strangelove.

Hayden bought a canal barge in the Netherlands in 1969, eventually moving it to the heart of Paris and living on it part of the time. He also shared a home in Wilton, Connecticut, with his family and had an apartment in Sausalito. 

He returned to filmmaking with Hard Contract (1969), supporting James Coburn and Loving (1970), co-starring George Segal and Eva Marie Saint.

"I'll go back to Hollywood to pick up a dollar, but that's all", he said. "Everything is wrong with that city."

Hayden went to Europe where he appeared in Ternos Caçadores (1970), Angel's Leap (1971) and Le grand départ (1972). He had small but important roles in The Godfather (1972) and The Long Goodbye (1973).

He made some films in Europe: The Final Programme (1973), Deadly Strangers (1975), Cipolla Colt (1975) and 1900 (1975). He was offered the role of "Quint" in Jaws (1975) but turned it down.

In the 1970s, after his appearance in The Godfather, he appeared several times on NBC's Tomorrow Show with Tom Snyder, where he talked about his career resurgence and how it had funded his travels and adventures around the world. He also appeared on the Canadian sci-fi TV series The Starlost, and the U.S. detective show Banacek.

He returned to Hollywood for King of the Gypsies (1978), Winter Kills (1979), The Outsider (1980), 9 to 5 (1980), Gas (1981), Venom (1981) and The Blue and the Gray (1982).

In 1981, he was arrested for possession of hashish at Toronto International Airport.

Hayden wrote two acclaimed books: an autobiography, Wanderer (1962), and a novel, Voyage (1976). He said they made him "a lot of money" but he lost most of it to taxes.

In 1983, he appeared in a documentary of his life, Pharos of Chaos.

Wives
Hayden was married three times.
Madeleine Carroll, 1942–1946. 
Betty Ann de Noon, 1947–1958. They had four children, Christian, Dana, Gretchen and Matthew. 
Catherine Devine McConnell, 1960–1986. They had two children, Andrew and David.

Death
Hayden died of prostate cancer in Sausalito in 1986, age 70.

Military awards
Hayden received the following awards during World War II:

References in popular culture
In 2011 the American singer-songwriter Tom Russell released the song "Sterling Hayden" on his album Mesabi. 

Hayden, under his nom de guerre Lieutenant John Hamilton, and his role as an OSS agent play a secondary part in the 2012 novel Death's Door: A Billy Boyle World War II mystery by author James R. Benn. Hayden/Hamilton assists in getting protagonist Billy Boyle through German-occupied Italy.

Filmography

Bibliography

See also
Leuchtturm des Chaos, a 1983 documentary profile of Sterling Hayden

Footnotes

References

External links

 
 Biography with many photos
 Hayden related documents on his OSS service.  National Archives and Records Administration (150 MB)
 Literature on Sterling Hayden

Video clips
 
  in black comedy role as General Jack D. Ripper with co-star Peter Sellers
 Video interview with Hayden at his home in Sausalito, California, 1983

1916 births
1986 deaths
20th-century American male actors
20th-century American male writers
20th-century American novelists
American autobiographers
American communists
American male comedy actors
American male film actors
American male non-fiction writers
American male novelists
American male television actors
American sailors
Deaths from cancer in California
Deaths from prostate cancer
Male actors from New Jersey
Male Western (genre) film actors
Members of the Communist Party USA
Military personnel from New Jersey
Paramount Pictures contract players
People from Dexter, Maine
People from Montclair, New Jersey
People from Sausalito, California
People from Wilton, Connecticut
People of the Office of Strategic Services
Recipients of the Silver Star
United States Army personnel of World War II
United States Army soldiers
United States Marine Corps officers
United States Marine Corps personnel of World War II
United States Marines
United States Merchant Mariners
World War II spies for the United States